The Stealth B6 is a purpose-built grand tourer-style race car, designed, developed and built to GT1 rules and regulations, and used for sports car racing in 2000.

References

Grand tourer racing cars